1952–53 was the fortieth occasion on which the Lancashire Cup completion had been held.
Leigh won the trophy  by beating St. Helens by the score of 22-5.
The match was played at Station Road, (historically in the county of Lancashire). The attendance was 34,785 and receipts were £5,793.

Background 

Overall, the number of teams entering this year’s competition remained the same as last year’s total of 14  
The same pre-war fixture format was retained. This season saw no bye but one “blank” or “dummy” fixture in the first round. There was also one bye but no “blank” fixture” in the second round. 
As last season, all the first round matches of the competition will be played on the basis of two legged, home and away, ties – and the remainder of the rounds remaining on straight forward knock-out basis.

Competition and results

Round 1 – first leg 
Involved  7 matches (with no bye and one “blank” fixture) and 14 clubs

Round 1 – second leg  
Involved  7 matches (with no bye and one “blank” fixture) and 14 clubs. These are the reverse fixture from the first leg

Round 2 - quarterfinals 
Involved 3 matches (with one bye) and 7 clubs

Round 3 – semifinals  
Involved 2 matches and 4 clubs

Final

Teams and scorers 

Scoring - Try = three (3) points - Goal = two (2) points - Drop goal = two (2) points

The road to success 
All the first round ties were played on a two leg (home and away) basis.
The first club named in each of the first round ties played the first leg at home.
The scores shown in the first round are the aggregate score over the two legs.

Notes and comments 
1 * Attendance given in official St. Helens archives as 34,541 - data given in Rothmans Rugby League Yearbook 1991 as 34,785
2 * Station Road was the home ground of Swinton from 1929 to 1932 and at its peak was one of the finest rugby league grounds in the country and it boasted a capacity of 60,000. The actual record attendance was for the Challenge Cup semi-final on 7 April 1951 when 44,621 watched Wigan beat Warrington 3-2

See also 
1952–53 Northern Rugby Football League season
Rugby league county cups

References

External links
Saints Heritage Society
1896–97 Northern Rugby Football Union season at wigan.rlfans.com
Hull&Proud Fixtures & Results 1896/1897
Widnes Vikings - One team, one passion Season In Review - 1896-97
The Northern Union at warringtonwolves.org

1952 in English rugby league
RFL Lancashire Cup